This is a list of members of the 10th National Assembly of South Korea which sat from 17 March 1979 to 17 May 1980.

Members

Seoul

Busan

Gyeonggi

Gangwon

North Chungcheong

South Chungcheong

North Jeolla

South Jeolla

North Gyeongsang

South Gyeongsang

Jeju

Presidential appointments 

 An Gap-jun
 Baek Yeong-hun
 Byeon U-ryang
 Cheon Byeong-gyu
 Choi Dae-hyeon
 Choi Gyeong-rok
 Choi Tae-ho
 Choi U-geun
 Choi Yeong-hui
 Ham Myeong-su
 Han Gi-chun
 Han Ok-sin
 Han Tae-yeon
 Hyeon Gi-sun
 Jang Gi-seon
 Jang Ji-ryang
 Jeon Bu-il
 Jeon Jeong-gu
 Jeong Byeong-hak
 Jeong Hui-chae
 Jeong Il-yeong
 Jeong Jae-ho
 Jo Byeong-gyu
 Jo Hong-rae
 Jo Il-je
 Jo Sang-ho
 Kal Bong-geun
 Kim Bong-gi
 Kim Jong-ha
 Kim Ju-in
 Kim Ok-yeol
 Kim Se-bae
 Kim Seong-hwan
 Kim Yeong-gwang
 Kim Yeong-ja
 Kim Yeong-su
 Kim Yong-ho
 Kim Yun-hwan
 Ko Jae-pil
 Lee Cheol-hui
 Lee Do-hwan
 Lee Dong-won
 Lee Gyeong-ho
 Lee Hae-won
 Lee Ja-heon
 Lee Jeong-seok
 Lee Jeong-sik
 Lee Jong-chan
 Lee Jong-ryul
 Lee Jong-sik
 Lee Myeong-chun
 Lee Sang-ik
 Lee Seok-je
 Lee Seong-geun
 Lee Seung-yun
 Lee Yang-u
 Lee Yeong-geun
 O Jun-seok
 Paik Too-chin
 Park Dong-ang
 Park Hyeon-seo
 Park Hyeong-gyu
 Park Jun-gyu
 Seo Yeong-hui
 Seon U-ryeon
 Shin Beom-sik
 Shin Cheol-gyu
 Shin Dong-sun
 Shin Gwang-sun
 Shin Sang-cheol
 Shin Sang-cho
 Shin Yung-taek
 Song Bang-yong
 Tae Wan-seon
 Yun In-sik
 Yun Sik
 Yun Yeo-hun
 Ko Gwi-nam
 Nam Jae-han
 Lee Ho-dong
 Kim Yu-bok

Notes

See also 

 1978 South Korean legislative election
 National Assembly (South Korea)#History

References 

010
National Assembly members 010